Epiphragmophora is a genus of air-breathing land snails, terrestrial pulmonate gastropod mollusks in the subfamily Epiphragmophorinae. 

It occurs exclusively in South America, and is distributed in Perú, Bolivia, Paraguay and Argentina, with isolated occurrences in southern Colombia and southern Brazil. This genus is known to be a typical component of the Andean fauna, although it inhabits elevated cloud rainforest areas and flatlands in Argentina and Bolivia.

Species
Species in the genus Epiphragmophora include:

Epiphragmophora alsophila (Philippi, 1867)
Epiphragmophora angrandi (Morelet, 1863)
Epiphragmophora argentina (Holmberg, 1909)
Epiphragmophora atahualpa Pilsbry, 1944
Epiphragmophora audouini (d’Orbigny, 1835)
Epiphragmophora basiplanata Weyrauch, 1960
Epiphragmophora birabeni Parodiz, 1955
Epiphragmophora cerrateae Weyrauch, 1960
Epiphragmophora costellata Fernández & Rumi, 1974
Epiphragmophora cryptomphala Ancey, 1897
Epiphragmophora clausomphalos (Deville & Hupe, 1850)
Epiphragmophora escoipensis Cuezzo, 1996
Epiphragmophora estella (d’Orbigny, 1835)
Epiphragmophora farrisi (Pfeiffer, 1859)
Epiphragmophora granulosa Weyrauch, 1960
Epiphragmophora gueinzii (Pfeiffer, 1856)
Epiphragmophora guevarai Cuezzo, 2006
Epiphragmophora haasi Zilch, 1953
Epiphragmophora hemiclausa Hylton Scott, 1951
Epiphragmophora hemiophalus Haas, 1951
Epiphragmophora hieronymi Doering, 1874
Epiphragmophora higginsi (Miller, 1878)
Epiphragmophora huancabambensis (Pilsbry, 1926)
Epiphragmophora huanucensis (Philippi, 1867)
Epiphragmophora jaspidea (Pfeiffer, 1859)
Epiphragmophora jujuyensis Hylton Scott, 1962
Epiphragmophora lentiformis (Haas, 1955)
Epiphragmophora leucobasis Haas, 1951
Epiphragmophora llaguenica Zilch, 1953
Epiphragmophora macasi (Higgins, 1872)
Epiphragmophora mirabilis Weyrauch, 1960
Epiphragmophora olssoni Pilsbry, 1926
Epiphragmophora ormeai Weyrauch, 1956
Epiphragmophora orophila Ancey, 1903
Epiphragmophora oroyensis Pilsbry, 1926
Epiphragmophora oresigena (d’Orbigny, 1835)
Epiphragmophora parodizi Fernández & Rumi, 1984
Epiphragmophora proseni Hylton Scott, 1951
Epiphragmophora puella Hylton Scott, 1951
Epiphragmophora puntana (Holmberg, 1909)
Epiphragmophora quirogai Cuezzo, 2006
Epiphragmophora rhathymos (Holmberg, 1912)
Epiphragmophora saltana Ancey, 1897
Epiphragmophora taulisensis Zilch, 1953
Epiphragmophora tomsici Fernández & Rumi, 1984
Epiphragmophora trenquelleonis (Grateloup, 1851)
Epiphragmophora trifasciata Fernández & Rumi, 1984
Epiphragmophora trigrammephora (d’Orbigny, 1835)
Epiphragmophora tucumanensis (Doering, 1874)
Epiphragmophora variegata Hylton Scott, 1962
Epiphragmophora villavilensis Parodiz, 1955
Epiphragmophora walshi Cuezzo, 2006
Epiphragmophora webbi Pilsbry, 1932
Epiphragmophora zilchi Weyrauch, 1960

References

Xanthonychidae